Raja Birendra Chandra College, established in 1965, is a general degree college in Murshidabad district. It offers undergraduate courses in arts and commerce. It is affiliated to  University of Kalyani.

Departments

Arts and Commerce

Bengali
English
Sanskrit
History
Geography
Political Science
Philosophy
Education
Commerce

Accreditation
The college is recognized by the University Grants Commission (UGC).

See also

References

External links
Raja Birendra Chandra College
University of Kalyani
University Grants Commission
National Assessment and Accreditation Council

Universities and colleges in Murshidabad district
Colleges affiliated to University of Kalyani
Educational institutions established in 1965
1965 establishments in West Bengal